The 1983–84 John Player Cup was the 13th edition of England's premier rugby union club competition at the time. Bath won the competition defeating Bristol in the final. The event was sponsored by John Player cigarettes and the final was held at Twickenham Stadium.

Draw and results

First round

Second round

Third round

Fourth round

Wasps progress due to more tries*

Quarter-finals

Semi-finals

Final

References

1983–84 rugby union tournaments for clubs
1983–84 in English rugby union
RFU Knockout Cup